Otjimbingwe (also: Otjimbingue) is a settlement in the Erongo Region of central Namibia. It has approximately 8,000 inhabitants.

History
The area was already a temporary settlement of some Herero in the early 18th century. Their chief Tjiponda coined the name Otjizingue (referring to the natural spring) from which the settlement's name developed.

The Rhenish Mission Society used Otjimbingwe as a central location for their Namibian mission in 1849. Johannes Rath and his family settled in the area on 11 July that year.

In 1854, copper was found in the nearby Khomas highlands and the Walwich Bay Mining Company established its offices in the city. Miners and merchants flocked to the settlement, and the researcher and businessman Karl Johan Andersson bought the entire settlement in 1860. He sold it five years later to the Rhenish Missionary Society. However the supply had been exhausted by that time, and the mining operations ceded.

The settlement was attacked and plundered several times in its early history. In 1863 the Battle of Otjimbinge took place, one of the largest battles of the Herero-Nama War. Andersson and the Herero fought the Oorlam people under Christian Afrikaner.

Rhenish missionary Carl Hugo Hahn founded the Augustineum, a seminary and teacher training college in 1866. It remained in Otjimbingwe until 1890 and was then moved to Okahandja. Hahn also founded the first school of South West Africa at Otjimbingwe in 1876.

Under the control of Commissioner Dr. Heinrich Ernst Göring, the place became the seat of the colonial administration, the de facto capital, in the late 1880s. On 16 July 1888, German South West Africa first post office opened in town. However, control gradually shifted to Windhoek, and the civil administration moved there in 1892. The railway line from Windhoek and Swakopmund was completed in the early 1900s, bypassing Otjimbingwe, and the city greatly declined in size thereafter.

People
Otjimbingwe is a centre of Herero tradition and culture. In the 19th century it was the seat of the Zeraua royal house and hosted several important meetings of the OvaHerero community. On 15 June 1863, in the wake of the Herero-Nama War, most of the Herero communities sent representatives to unify the Herero for the war, while king Zeraua sent a delegation to the port of Walvis Bay to acquire weapons. In 1867 the Herero agreed to establish the position for a paramount chief, which has been in place since then.

Historic buildings

The Rhenish church in the settlement's centre is one of the settlement's main attractions. Constructed in 1867 and proclaimed a National Monument in 1974. It is Namibia's oldest church. Another proclaimed National Monument is the Pulverturm (armory tower) erected in 1870.

Education
Da-Palm Senior Secondary School, is situated in the settlement on the banks of the Swakop River.

Natural History
The type specimens of the scorpion species Uroplectes otjimbinguensis were collected near Otjimbingwe, and the species was named after the town.

References

External links
Namibia-travel.net
Holiday & Travel
Henckert online

 
Populated places in the Erongo Region
Rhenish mission stations in Hereroland
Populated places established in 1864
1864 establishments in South West Africa